Postplatyptilia pusillus is a moth of the family Pterophoridae. It was described by Rodolfo Amando Philippi in 1864.

The type specimens are all lost. Philipp Christoph Zeller stated in 1877: "it is hardly possible to determine what  species is involved by the description made." Cees Gielis stated in 2006: "This is however not correct, because the mentioning of: 'die Fuehler sind am Grunde blass rosenroth' [the feet are pale rose red at the bottom], gives a good characteristic."

References

pusillus
Moths described in 1864